Scot Mendelson (born February 21, 1969) is an American armwrestler and powerlifter, who specializes in the bench press. He has broken multiple world records and was the raw (unassisted) world record holder in the 308-pound weight class with a  bench press from 2002 to 2020 and the equipped world record holder in the 275-pound class with a  bench press from 2009 to 2021. Working as a self-employed personal trainer, he runs his own gym called F.I.T.

Early life
Scot Mendelson is Jewish, and grew up in Brooklyn, New York. His maternal grandfather, Morris Reif, known as the “Bronxville Bomber,” was Rocky Marciano’s stable mate and scored 75 knockouts in 115 fights. In his youth Scot Mendelson loved sports and played baseball and American football. Starting strength training when he reached his teens, he moved into the sport of wrestling and boxing, where he first recognized his rapid growth in strength. Then he moved into bodybuilding. With his pure strength showing even more through his bodybuilding training, Scot decided to become a powerlifter.

Powerlifting career
On October 12, 2002, at 308.0 pound bodyweight Scot Mendelson bench pressed 701 lbs (318 kg) without a bench shirt in San Francisco, California (American Powerlifting Association (APF)) for an all-time raw (unassisted) world record in the heavyweight class (308 pounds).All-time RAW Powerlifting world records compiled and updated by PowerliftingWatch.com He became the all-time raw world record holder regardless of weight class for the first time when he pressed 713 lbs (323.4 kg) on February 8, 2003 @ Stark's Gym San Carlos Ca surpassing the previous 711 lbs-mark of Big James Hendersonheld for 5 years.

At the age of 36, improving his own world record in the raw bench press, Mendelson pressed 715.0 lbs (324.3 kg) with Ed Coan as head judge at the New England Bench Press Classic (Atlantis) on May 22, 2005. This record was not broken for 8 years until Eric Spoto bench pressed 722 lb (327.5 kg) raw in 2013.

Mendelson also held the former all-time world record in equipped bench press: On February 18, 2006 at the Fit Expo at the 2006 Iron Man Bodybuilding contest, he pressed 457.5 kg (1008.6 lbs) on his first attempt, beating the previous record by Gene Rychlak. He then attempted 1031 pounds and 1048 pounds on that same event, but failed. The event also included the APF Mendelson Bench Press Classic in Pasadena, California. The new all-time equipped world record is now held by Ryan Kennelly with a weight of 488.6 kg (1075 lbs).

Currently, Mendelson holds the World Powerlifting Congress (WPC) bench press world record with a 1025.15 lbs (465 kg) press (SHW division in Open and Masters age class), done on November 23, 2008 at the WPC World Championships in Palm Beach Gardens West Palm Beach, Florida.

Mendelson has since cut down some weight and became the current all-time equipped world record holder in the 275-pound weight class (in Open and Masters age class) besting the previous world record by 83 pounds with a 467.5 kg (1030.7 lbs) bench press on December 12, 2009 in Camarillo, California (APF).

Scot Mendelson is a three-times national and four-times World Champion in the bench press. He has broken 60 world records during his career.

Personal records

Powerlifting Competition Records:

done in official Powerlifting meets
 Raw Bench press – 701.1 lbs (318.0 kg) @308 lb class raw with only wrist wraps and a belt (APC 2002)
 Raw Bench press – 715.0 lbs (324.3 kg) @SHW class raw with only wrist wraps and a belt (Atlantis 2005)
 Equipped Bench press – 1030.7 lbs (467.5 kg) @275 lb class (APF 2008)
 Equipped Bench press – 1025.1 lbs (465.0 kg) @SHW class (APF/WPC 2008)
Powerlifting Gym Records (unofficial):

done in the gym according to Scot himself
 Equipped Bench Press – 1201 lbs
 Squat – 900 lbs (not below parallel like a competition lift)
 Deadlift: 880 lbs
 Raw Bench Press: 650 lbs for 8 repetitions

Personal life
He is divorced (2008) to his ex-wife, Maricelle, herself a World Champion Powerlifter, Kung Fu practicant and a martial arts champion. They have three children, two girls and a boy.

In 2004, Mendelson was involved in a devastating car accident, that sent him to intensive care for three weeks with a fractured skull, broken ribs, broken leg and a right foot held on only by the skin. After a dozen surgeries, his right ankle was finally removed and he was left with one leg about 2 ½ inches shorter than the other. He was also left with an addiction to Vicodin. The ankle injury is also the main reason why he is unable to compete in the other powerlifting disciplines – the squat and the deadlift.

Mendelson runs his own 6,000-sq. ft. private personal training gym in Sherman Oaks called "Fitness Individualized Training" (F.I.T.), which teaches strength training and combat sports. Being a supporter for the legalization of cannabis for medical purposes since his car accident, he also opened up his own medical marijuana dispensary called "Mendica" in November 2009, which he runs together with the actor Eric Roberts. The "Mendica Wellness Center" combines the dispensary with the F.I.T. gym to be a one-stop shop for rehab, rebuilding, relaxation and natural pain medication.

After a car accident in 2015 that made Mendelson unable to be a top level powerlifter, he started armwrestling in 2016 and has placed high in national level championship and attended the zloty tour 2018.

See also
 Progression of the bench press world record
 Ryan Kennelly
 Gene Rychlak
 Eric Spoto
 Big James Henderson
 Jim Williams
 Ted Arcidi
 List of powerlifters

References

Living people
Jewish American sportspeople
American powerlifters
1969 births
21st-century American Jews